Oregon Route 234 is an Oregon state highway which runs between the city of Gold Hill, Oregon and the town of Eagle Point.

Route description
OR 234 begins, at its western terminus, at an interchange with Interstate 5 in Gold Hill.  For the first several miles of the highway's existence, it is concurrent with Oregon Route 99, which departs from the freeway to serve Gold Hill.  In the city center, OR 234 and OR 99 diverge; with the latter returning to the freeway.  OR 234 then heads northeast, passing through the northern edge of the Rogue Valley and the Cascade foothills.  It passes nearby the community of Sams Valley, and ends at an intersection with Oregon Route 62, north of Eagle Point.

Major intersections

See also

References

234
Transportation in Jackson County, Oregon